Zuberu Sharani (born 7 January 2000) is a Ghanaian professional footballer who plays as a right winger for ŠK Slovan Bratislava.

Club career

Dunajská Streda
Sharani made his Fortuna Liga debut for DAC against Žilina on 29 September 2019. Sharani came on as a late second-half substitute, replacing Eric Ramírez. DAC won the game 1−0 thanks to a first-half goal by Eric Davis.

Sharani scored DAC's 1000th top division goal on 27 August 2021 in an away fixture against Pohronie, sealing the 3−0 victory following earlier goals by András Schäfer and Milan Dimun.

References

External links
 Futbalnet profile 
 
 

2000 births
Living people
Footballers from Accra
Ghanaian footballers
Ghanaian expatriate footballers
Association football midfielders
Dreams F.C. (Ghana) players
AC Sparta Prague players
FC DAC 1904 Dunajská Streda players
MFK Zemplín Michalovce players
FC ŠTK 1914 Šamorín players
ŠK Slovan Bratislava players
Ghana Premier League players
Slovak Super Liga players
Expatriate footballers in the Czech Republic
Ghanaian expatriate sportspeople in the Czech Republic
Expatriate footballers in Slovakia
Ghanaian expatriate sportspeople in Slovakia